Archipimima telemaco is a species of moth of the family Tortricidae. It is found in Paraná, Brazil.

The ground colour of the forewings is pale brownish with some whitish cream parts, brownish suffusions and brown dots. The hindwings are greyish brown, but more cream at the costa and dotted with brown.

Etymology
The species name refers to the type locality.

References

Atteriini
Moths described in 2011
Moths of South America
Taxa named by Józef Razowski